Piipponen is a surname. Notable people with the surname include:

 Samuli Piipponen (born 1993), Finnish professional ice hockey defenceman 
 Tapio Piipponen (born 1957), Finnish biathlete
 Topi Piipponen (born 1997), Finnish professional ice hockey player

Finnish-language surnames